Trina Solar Co., Ltd. is a Chinese photovoltaics company founded in 1997. The company manufactures, sells and does research and development on PV products, EPC and O&M. It also develops and sells smart micro-grid and multi-energy complementary systems and energy cloud-platform operations. In 2018, Trina Solar launched Energy IoT brand, established the Trina Energy IoT Industrial Development Alliance together with leading companies and research institutes in China and elsewhere and founded the New Energy IoT Industrial Innovation Center. In June 2020, Trina Solar listed on the STAR Market of Shanghai Stock Exchange.

References

External links 
 

Companies formerly listed on the New York Stock Exchange
Photovoltaics manufacturers
Manufacturing companies of China
Companies based in Changzhou
Companies established in 1997
Chinese brands